Bridgewater Center is an unincorporated community in Williams County, in the U.S. state of Ohio.

History
Bridgewater Center had its start in 1844 when a gristmill and sawmill were built there. The community was named for its location near the geographical center of Bridgewater Township. A post office was established at Bridgewater Center in 1846, and remained in operation until 1903. Bridgewater Center was platted in 1871.

References

Unincorporated communities in Williams County, Ohio
Unincorporated communities in Ohio